A designated place is a type of geographic unit used by Statistics Canada to disseminate census data. It is usually "a small community that does not meet the criteria used to define incorporated municipalities or Statistics Canada population centres (areas with a population of at least 1,000 and no fewer than 400 persons per square kilometre)." Provincial and territorial authorities collaborate with Statistics Canada in the creation of designated places so that data can be published for sub-areas within municipalities. Starting in 2016, Statistics Canada allowed the overlapping of designated places with population centres.

In the 2021 Census of Population, Newfoundland and Labrador had 207 designated places, an increase from 199 in 2016. Among these designated places are 5 retired population centres. Newfoundland and Labrador's largest designated place is Goulds with a population of 4,441.

List

See also 
List of census agglomerations in Atlantic Canada
List of communities in Newfoundland and Labrador
List of local service districts in Newfoundland and Labrador
List of municipalities in Newfoundland and Labrador
List of population centres in Newfoundland and Labrador

Notes

References 

Designated